Colton Grundy: The Undying is the second studio album by American rapper Blaze Ya Dead Homie. The album was released on October 19, 2004. This album features Blaze rapping under his alternate persona, Colton Grundy, who he is credited as on this release and on guest appearances elsewhere during this period.

Music and lyrics
Allmusic described the music of Colton Grundy as "Snoop Dogg-esque mid-tempo G-funk matched with vintage monster-movie sound effects and heavy rock-style beats". The lyrics make reference to murder, intoxication, misogyny, gangsta rap themes and supernatural fantasy.

Reception

Allmusic called the album "a frightening and rump-shaking addition to the ever-growing Psychopathic Records canon".

Colton Grundy peaked at #9 on the Billboard Top Heatseekers chart, #16 on the Top Independent Albums chart, #57 on the Top R&B/Hip-Hop Albums chart, #167 on the Top Internet Albums chart, and #167 on the Billboard 200. The track "Shotgun" was featured in the video game 25 To Life, which also featured  music by Tupac Shakur, Public Enemy, DMX, Geto Boys and Tech N9ne.

Track listing

Personnel

Vocals, Lyrics
Blaze Ya Dead Homie
Anybody Killa - (3, 8, 13)
Esham - (3, 15)
Lavel - (5)
Violent J - (12, 15)
Twiztid - (15)

Additional Vocals
JD Tha Weed Man - (1)
The R.O.C. - (1, 11)
Lavel - (1, 4, 15)
Jamie Madrox - (3, 12)
Violent J - (3, 4, 8)
Esham - (4)
Somedumb Drunkbitch - (6)
MC Breed - (13)
Shaggy 2 Dope - (15)

Production (Produced by)
The R.O.C. - (1, 2, 11)
Lavel - (3, 8, 9, 14)
Fritz The Cat - (4, 5, 7, 9, 10, 11, 12, 13, 15)
Butch - (6, 12)
Blaze Ya Dead Homie - (9)

Production (Engineered by)
Scott Sumner - (1, 2, 3, 5, 14)
Fritz The Cat - (4, 7, 10, 11, 12, 13, 15)
Mike P. - (6)
Lavel - (8)
Violent J - (9)

Production (Additional Engineering by)
Fritz The Cat - (1, 2, 8)
Lavel - (3, 5, 14)

Production (Mixed by)
Dr. Punch - (1, 3, 4, 6, 7, 8, 9, 11, 12, 13, 15)
Systasyrosis Soundsquad - (2, 14)
Fritz The Cat - (5, 10)
Blaze Ya Dead Homie - (10)
Lavel - (10)

Charts

References

Blaze Ya Dead Homie albums
2004 albums
Psychopathic Records albums
G-funk albums
Horrorcore albums